The 21st Indian Infantry Division was a division of the Indian Army during World War II. It was formed in April 1944 in Assam and is now part of  IV Corps or Gajraj corps.

History 
The 21st Indian Infantry Division was a division of the Indian Army during World War II. It was formed in April 1944, in Assam. It never saw any combat and its only sub unit was the 268th Indian Infantry Brigade. The division was disbanded and its units transferred to become the 44th Airborne Division in June 1944.

On formation, 268th Indian Infantry Brigade, converted from 268th Indian Armoured Brigade in August 1942, consisted of 17/7th Rajput Regiment, 2/4th Bombay Grenadiers, 5/4th Bombay Grenadiers, 2nd Battalion, The King's Own Scottish Borderers, 2nd Battalion, The South Lancashire Regiment, 429th Field Company Indian Engineers, and 45 Cavalry.

The division was reformed within the Indian Army after the Partition of India and is now part of IV Corps. It was raised in 1963 and assigned to Arunachal Pradesh, west of 5 Mountain Division.

Also see 
IV Corps (India)
Eastern Command (India)

References

Indian World War II divisions
Divisions of the Indian Army
British Indian Army divisions
Military units and formations established in 1944
Military units and formations of the British Empire in World War II